The women's team regu sepak takraw competition at the 2010 Asian Games in Guangzhou was held from 16 November to 20 November at the Haizhu Sports Center.

Squads

Results 
All times are China Standard Time (UTC+08:00)

Preliminary

Group A

|-
|rowspan=2|16 November||rowspan=2|08:30
|rowspan=2 align=right|
|rowspan=2 align=center|3–0
|rowspan=2 align=left|
|colspan=3|2–0||colspan=3|2–0||colspan=3|2–0
|-
|21–19||21–14|| ||21–8||21–16|| ||21–14||21–14||
|-
|rowspan=2|16 November||rowspan=2|19:00
|rowspan=2 align=right|
|rowspan=2 align=center|3–0
|rowspan=2 align=left|
|colspan=3|2–0||colspan=3|2–0||colspan=3|2–0
|-
|21–6||21–12|| ||24–22||21–19|| ||21–7||21–7||
|-
|rowspan=2|18 November||rowspan=2|08:30
|rowspan=2 align=right|
|rowspan=2 align=center|1–2
|rowspan=2 align=left|
|colspan=3|2–0||colspan=3|1–2||colspan=3|0–2
|-
|21–14||21–12|| ||21–15||17–21||13–15||19–21||20–22||

Group B

|-
|rowspan=2|16 November||rowspan=2|14:00
|rowspan=2 align=right|
|rowspan=2 align=center|3–0
|rowspan=2 align=left|
|colspan=3|2–0||colspan=3|2–0||colspan=3|2–0
|-
|21–9||21–10|| ||21–13||21–13|| ||21–14||22–20||
|-
|rowspan=2|16 November||rowspan=2|14:00
|rowspan=2 align=right|
|rowspan=2 align=center|0–3
|rowspan=2 align=left|
|colspan=3|0–2||colspan=3|0–2||colspan=3|0–2
|-
|13–21||13–21|| ||8–21||12–21|| ||14–21||11–21||
|-
|rowspan=2|17 November||rowspan=2|08:30
|rowspan=2 align=right|
|rowspan=2 align=center|3–0
|rowspan=2 align=left|
|colspan=3|2–0||colspan=3|2–0||colspan=3|2–0
|-
|21–13||21–7|| ||21–7||21–8|| ||21–13||21–13||
|-
|rowspan=2|17 November||rowspan=2|14:00
|rowspan=2 align=right|
|rowspan=2 align=center|3–0
|rowspan=2 align=left|
|colspan=3|2–0||colspan=3|2–0||colspan=3|2–0
|-
|21–9||21–13|| ||21–11||21–14|| ||21–15||21–12||
|-
|rowspan=2|18 November||rowspan=2|14:00
|rowspan=2 align=right|
|rowspan=2 align=center|3–0
|rowspan=2 align=left|
|colspan=3|2–0||colspan=3|2–0||colspan=3|2–0
|-
|21–9||21–4|| ||21–8||21–5|| ||21–4||21–11||
|-
|rowspan=2|18 November||rowspan=2|14:00
|rowspan=2 align=right|
|rowspan=2 align=center|0–3
|rowspan=2 align=left|
|colspan=3|0–2||colspan=3|0–2||colspan=3|0–2
|-
|19–21||15–21|| ||11–21||11–21|| ||15–21||15–21||

Knockout round

Semifinals

|-
|rowspan=2|19 November||rowspan=2|08:30
|rowspan=2 align=right|
|rowspan=2 align=center|1–2
|rowspan=2 align=left|
|colspan=3|2–1||colspan=3|0–2||colspan=3|0–2
|-
|21–17||19–21||15–13||19–21||14–21|| ||15–21||12–21||
|-
|rowspan=2|19 November||rowspan=2|08:30
|rowspan=2 align=right|
|rowspan=2 align=center|2–0
|rowspan=2 align=left|
|colspan=3|2–1||colspan=3|2–1||colspan=3|
|-
|21–19||19–21||17–15||21–10||18–21||15–13|| || ||

Final

|-
|rowspan=2|20 November||rowspan=2|08:30
|rowspan=2 align=right|
|rowspan=2 align=center|0–2
|rowspan=2 align=left|
|colspan=3|0–2||colspan=3|0–2||colspan=3|
|-
|10–21||16–21|| ||17–21||11–21|| || || ||

References 

Official Website
Results

Sepak takraw at the 2010 Asian Games